{{Infobox weapon
|name=Schwerer Zugkraftwagen 18 t, Sd.Kfz. 9
| image= Bundesarchiv Bild 101I-311-0904-04A, Italien, Zugkraftwagen, Panzer VI (Tiger I).jpg
| image_size = 300
|caption=Two Sd.Kfz. 9s are prepared to tow a Tiger I
|origin=
|type=Heavy half-track

|is_vehicle=yes

|service= 1938–1945
|used_by= Romania Finland  Kingdom of Bulgaria
|wars= World War II

|designer= FAMO
|design_date=1936–1939
|manufacturer=FAMO, Vomag, Tatra
|production_date=1939–1945
|unit_cost= 60000 Reichsmark
|number=approx. 2500
|variants=Sd.Kfz. 9/1, Sd.Kfz. 9/2

| spec_label=
|weight=
|length=
|part_length=
|width=
|height= overall
|crew=depends on body type fitted

|armour=
|primary_armament=
|secondary_armament=
|engine=10.8L Maybach HL 108 petrol, 12-cylinder, water-cooled
|engine_power=
|transmission= 4 + 1 speed ZF G 65 VL 230
|payload_capacity=
|fuel_capacity=
|pw_ratio=
|suspension=torsion bar
|clearance=
|vehicle_range=  road cross-country
|speed=  road
}}

The Sd.Kfz. 9 (also known as "Famo" ) was a German half-track that saw widespread use in World War II, and the heaviest half-track vehicle of any type built in quantity in Nazi Germany during the war years. Its main roles were as a prime mover for very heavy towed guns such as the 24 cm Kanone 3 and as a tank recovery vehicle. Approximately 2,500 were produced between 1938 and 1945.

Description

The Sd.Kfz. 9 had a ladder frame chassis. It had a syncromesh ZF G 65 VL 230 transmission with four forward and one reverse gears.

Both tracks and wheels were used for steering. The steering system was set up so that shallow turns used only the wheels, but brakes would be applied to the tracks the further the steering wheel was turned. The drive sprocket, like all German halftracks, had rollers rather than the more common teeth. The rear suspension consisted of six double sets of overlapping, interleaved Schachtellaufwerk layout roadwheels mounted on swing arms sprung by torsion bars. An idler wheel, mounted at the rear of the vehicle, was used to control track tension. The front wheels had leaf springs and shock absorbers.

The upper body had a crew compartment common to all versions. This had bench seats, one for the driver and his assistant, and another for the crew. The rear portion of the upper body was adapted for the vehicle's intended role. The artillery model had two extra bench seats for the gun's crew and space for its ammunition. The cargo version had just two storage compartments mounted in the front of the cargo compartment, one on each side, that opened to the outside. The windshield could fold forward and was also removable. A convertible canvas top was mounted at the upper part of the rear body. It fastened to the windshield when erected.

This was adequate for medium tanks like the Panzer IV, but two or even three or four were necessary for heavier vehicles like the Tiger I, Panther or King Tiger. It towed Sd.Anh 116 low-loader trailers to carry disabled vehicles.

All were equipped with a winch, mounted at the middle of the vehicle, just under the cargo platform.

Design and development
Preliminary design of all the German half-tracks of the early part of the war was done by Dipl.Ing. Ernst Kniepkamp of the Military Automotive Department (Wa Prüf 6) before the Nazis took power in 1933. His designs were then turned over to commercial firms for development and testing. Fahrzeug- und Motorenbau GmbH (FAMO) of Breslau received the contract for the  heavy towing tracked vehicle. Their first prototype, the FM gr 1, was completed in 1936. The F 2 prototype appeared in 1938, but differed only in detail from its predecessor.

The F 3 appeared in 1939 and was the production version. The design was simplified over the course of the war to reduce costs and the use of strategic metals. Some vehicles produced by Tatra had its 12-cylinder, air-cooled Type 103 diesel engine fitted. Large spades were added at the rear of the chassis during the war to improve the vehicle's ability to recover tanks and other heavy vehicles.

Variants

A new upper body was used for the Sd.Kfz. 9/1 which mounted a  capacity crane in lieu of the crew's bench seat and the cargo compartment. It was issued to tank maintenance units beginning in September 1941. A larger, gasoline-electric,  crane was fitted on the later Sd.Kfz. 9/2, but this required outriggers to stabilize the vehicle before operations could begin. There was also a tank recovery version with a giant spade-like metal plate connected to the rear of the frame. The spade holding frame could be lifted straight up for transport. It was meant to stabilize the vehicle while winching a heavy object on soft ground.8.8 cm Flak 18 anti-aircraft guns were mounted on fifteen Sd.Kfz. 9s in 1940 as the 8.8 cm Flak 18 (Sfl.) auf Zugkraftwagen 18t (Sd.Kfz. 9) for anti-tank duties. The crew and engine compartments were lightly, but completely, armored, which limited the gun's ability to fire directly ahead. A platform with drop-down sides was fitted for the gun. Outriggers were necessary to brace the platform sides to support the weight of the gun crew. One source claims that these vehicles were produced as prototypes in 1943.

Production

Vomag of Plauen began producing the Sd.Kfz. 9 in 1940 and Tatra joined in the last years of the war. 855 were on hand on 20 December 1942. 643 were built in 1943 and 834 in 1944. Approximately 2,500 were built in total.

Notes

References
 Chamberlain, Peter, and Hilary L. Doyle. Thomas L. Jentz (Technical Editor). Encyclopedia of German Tanks of World War Two: A Complete Illustrated Directory of German Battle Tanks, Armoured Cars, Self-propelled Guns, and Semi-tracked Vehicles, 1933–1945. London: Arms and Armour Press, 1978 (revised edition 1993). 
 Spielberger, Walter J. Halftracked Vehicles of the German Army 1909-1945. Atlgen, PA: Schiffer, 2008 

 Further reading 
 Frank, Reinhardt. Don Cox (translator).German Heavy Half-Tracked Prime Movers 1934–1945. Atglen, PA: Schiffer, 1996 (first published in German in 1994). 
  Seifert, Walter E. Der schwere Zugkraftwagen 18 t (Sd. Kfz. 9) FAMO''. Waffen-Arsenal Special No. 36. Wölfersheim-Berstadt: Podzun-Pallas-Verlag, 2003

External links

 Sd.Kfz. 9 on wwiivehicles.com
 Sd.Kfz. 9 on Lexikon der Wehrmacht (in German)

World War II half-tracks
Half-tracks of Germany
Military vehicles introduced in the 1930s